The 2019–20 FC Anzhi Makhachkala season was the club's first season back in the Russian Professional Football League, the third tier of football in Russia, since 1996. Anzhi finished the previous season bottom of the Russian Premier League and where initially relegated to the Russian National Football League for the 2019–20 season. However, on 15 May 2019, the club failed to earn a Russian Football Union license for the 2019–20 season, recalled their appeal against the decision on 29 May 2019, dropping down to the Russian Professional Football League.

Season events
On 3 June, Magomed Adiyev left the club after his contract had expired.

On 26 June, Anzhi confirmed that they had received a license to play in the Russian Professional Football League for the 2019–20 season, and that they were still unable to register new players due to outstanding debts.

On 28 September, Anzhi were docked six-points due to debt owed to former player Yannick Boli.

On 28 October, Valeri Barmin was dismissed as manager of Anzhi, with Artur Sadirov being appointed as Caretaker Manager the same day.

On 1 April, the Russian Football Union extended the suspension of football until 31 May.

On 15 May, the Russian Football Union announced that the Russian Professional Football League season had ended as of the result on 17 March 2020, du to COVID-19 pandemic.

Squad

Out on loan

Transfers

In

Out

Loans out

Released

Friendlies

Competitions

Professional Football League

Results by round

Results

League table

Russian Cup

Squad statistics

Appearances and goals

|-
|colspan="14"|Players away from the club on loan:

|-
|colspan="14"|Players who left Anzhi Makhachkala during the season:

|}

Goal scorers

Clean sheets

Disciplinary record

References

FC Anzhi Makhachkala seasons
Anzhi Makhachkala